USS Rescuer (ARS-18) was a Rescuer-class rescue and salvage ship commissioned by the U.S. Navy during World War II. Her task was to come to the aid of stricken vessels.

Construction and commissioning 

Rescuer (ARS-18) was built in 1904 as tug Casper by United Engine Works, and acquired for the Navy 6 February 1942 by the Port Director, San Pedro, California.

Service history 

Assigned to the 13th Naval District on 7 February 1942, Rescuer underwent conversion at Seattle, Washington, then headed north to the waters of the Territory of Alaska, where she served during her brief naval career.

On 31 December 1942, while engaged in salvaging the stranded Soviet cargo ship SS Turksib near Scotch Cap on the southwest corner of Unimak Island in the Aleutian Islands, Rescuer was carried on to the beach in an 80-mph (129-km/hr) gale, badly holed, and wrecked. Her third engineer fell overboard and drowned. Her name was struck from the Navy list on 22 December 1944.

References

External links 
 Dictionary of American Naval Fighting Ships 
 NavSource Online: Service Ship Photo Archive - ARS-18 Rescuer

1904 ships
1942 in Alaska
Ships built in Alameda, California
Shipwrecks of the Alaska coast
Unique rescue and salvage ships of the United States Navy
World War II auxiliary ships of the United States
World War II shipwrecks in the Pacific Ocean
Maritime incidents in December 1942
Ships of the Aleutian Islands campaign